The 2019–20 season was Paris Saint-Germain Féminine's 49th season since its creation in 1971, and its 33rd season in the top-flight of women's football in France.

Players

Out on loan

Transfers
Note:  indicates a mid-season transfer.

In

Out

Pre-season and friendlies

Competitions

Overview

Trophée des Championnes

Division 1 Féminine

League table

Results by round

Matches

Coupe de France

UEFA Women's Champions League

Knockout phase

Round of 32

Round of 16

Quarter-finals

Semi-finals

Statistics

|-
! colspan="14" style="background:#dcdcdc; text-align:center"| Goalkeepers

|-
! colspan="14" style="background:#dcdcdc; text-align:center"| Defenders

|-
! colspan="14" style="background:#dcdcdc; text-align:center"| Midfielders

|-
! colspan="14" style="background:#dcdcdc; text-align:center"| Forwards

|-
! colspan="14" style="background:#dcdcdc; text-align:center"| Players who joined the club during COVID-19 break and became eligible for official matches

|-
! colspan="14" style="background:#dcdcdc; text-align:center"| Players transferred out during the season

See also
 2019–20 Paris Saint-Germain F.C. season

Notes

References

Paris Saint-Germain Féminine seasons